Armed Support Units (ASU) are specialist armed response units of the Garda Síochána, the national police force of Ireland. Based in all six Garda regions in the country, Garda ASU officers carry a combination of lethal firearms and non-lethal weapons, as opposed to regular uniformed Gardaí who are unarmed. They are similar to Authorised Firearms Officers of British police forces.

Armed Support Units were known as Regional Support Units (RSU) until mid-2017.

Duties
A Garda Armed Support Unit may be called out to support local Garda officers in certain high-risk operations. This principally involves offering armed assistance to otherwise unarmed Gardaí who are dealing with an incident in which firearms or other weapons (knives, etc.) have been produced. It also includes:
 Confronting and disarming persons who are carrying knives or guns
 Saving a person's life through use of a defibrillator which they carry and are qualified to use
 Providing tactical support to other gardaí carrying out searches
 Carrying out high visibility static and rolling checkpoints and other operations to counteract the movements of criminals
 Overt armed airport and port patrols to counter terrorist attacks

Background
The first Regional Support Unit (RSU) was formed in 2008, following recommendations made by the Barr Tribunal, which brought the existence and role of the Emergency Response Unit (ERU) to public attention (April 2000, see Death of John Carthy), and questioned the Dublin-based units' ability to reach other areas of the country quickly.

Regional Support Units were originally assigned to support five individual Garda regions – administrative areas drawn on geographical lines which include the Eastern, Northern, Southern, South-Eastern and Western regions – but not the Dublin Metropolitan Region (DMR), which had remained the sole responsibility of the ERU. The first RSU was formed on a pilot basis in the Southern Region (the administrative area which includes counties Cork, Limerick and Kerry).

As of 2012, RSU units began operating on a full-time permanent armed basis in the Eastern, Northern, Southern, South-Eastern and Western regions after a trial period. Serious incidents such as barricaded sieges, hostage takings or terrorism triggers the response of the ERU anywhere in Ireland.

In 2016 it was decided that a sixth Regional Support Unit be established in the Dublin Metropolitan Region (DMR) to counteract the growing threat of gangland drug crime and terrorism risks. Previously the Dublin Garda region had been under the authority of the Garda ERU. As part of this process, the name Regional Support Unit was replaced by the term Armed Support Unit (ASU).

The Dublin ASU began operating in early 2016 with a complement of 55-60 full-time armed officers, including 5 sergeants. The Dublin-based unit is equipped with marked and unmarked vehicles, and was officially launched in late 2016.

In April 2016 it was confirmed that Armed Support Units would be deployed overtly to patrol both Dublin Airport and Dublin Port full-time on foot inside terminal buildings and via vehicles outside and surrounding the perimeter, carrying personal defense weapons, sidearms, tasers and other specialist equipment to counter the rising threat of terrorist attacks in Europe.

During the first six months of 2022, the ASU did not use their firearms at any time. They used a single "SIR-X" rubber bullet on one occasion.

Training and manpower
Garda ASU officers undergo training over a thirteen-week period, which includes instruction in:
 Critical incident response
 Tactical deployment
 Conflict resolution
 Negotiation techniques
 Deployment protocols and controls
 Dynamic entry methods
 Tactical driving
 First aid
 Use of less lethal options and firearms 
 Other relevant skills.

The Garda ERU are responsible for ASU training. Some ASU officers later go on to join the ERU. The membership of the Armed Support Unit consists exclusively of serving officers in the Garda Síochána, who must have at least 4 years experience and a clean disciplinary record.

There are Armed Support Units in all six regions, each has at least 24 members (Dublin has 55 to 60 members), putting the overall manpower at more than 175. The command of the ASU is the Regional Detective Superintendent. The ASU falls under the Garda's Special Operations & Tactics Command.

Notable incidents

On 30 December 2020, the ASU shot and killed George Nkencho in front of his west Dublin home after graduated attempts to disarm him failed. The Garda Síochána Ombudsman Commission launched an investigation into the circumstances of his death.

Equipment

Weapons
Members of the Armed Support Units are equipped similarly to members of the Special Detective Unit (SDU) and Emergency Response Unit.

ASU weapons include;
 SIG Sauer P226 9mm self-loading pistol
 Heckler & Koch MP7 personal defense weapon  (with ammunition that can penetrate body armour)
 Benelli M4 Super 90 semi-automatic shotgun

ASU units also carry less-lethal weapons, such as;
 Tasers
 Pepper sprays 
 Bean bag rounds (used along with shotgun)

Vehicles

Armed Support Units operate Volvo V70 XC70 (police variant) and Audi Q7 vehicles. In late 2017 BMW X5s were also introduced, along with one Ford Transit tactical support van.

The ASU vehicles are specially modified and distinguishable from other Garda vehicles by battenburg markings, the words "ARMED SUPPORT UNIT" on the doors and a distinctive red stripe along each side. The Volvo XC70s featured a light bar on the roof with an illuminated red message scroller bearing the term "GARDA ARMED SUPPORT UNIT", however newer vehicles feature a low profile light bar and XC70s in service in Dublin have been refitted with a more standard light bar. Older vehicles have been remarked to match the current style (original vehicles did not feature the red stripe and had a different, slightly less bright reflective pattern).

Patrol vehicles contain an equipment drawer and shelves in the boot to carry weapons and other tactical equipment.

See also 
 Headquarters Mobile Support Unit (Police Service of Northern Ireland)
 Specialist Firearms Command (Metropolitan Police Service, UK)
 Specialist Firearms Officer (UK)

References

External links

 Garda Síochána official website

Regional Support Units
Non-military counterterrorist organizations
Protective security units